Omar Jumaa (Arabic:عمر جمعه) (born 2 August 1995) is an Emirati footballer. He currently plays for Al-Nasr as a winger.

External links

References

Emirati footballers
1995 births
Living people
Sharjah FC players
Khor Fakkan Sports Club players
Al-Nasr SC (Dubai) players
UAE Pro League players
Association football wingers